Fryeria is a genus of sea slugs, dorid nudibranchs, shell-less marine gastropod molluscs in the family Phyllidiidae.

Fryeria has become a synonym of Phyllidia Cuvier, 1797

Species
Species in the genus Fryeria used to include:

 Fryeria bayi   Bouchet, 1983: synonym of Phyllidiopsis bayi (Bouchet, 1983)
 Fryeria guamensis   Brunckhorst, 1993: synonym of Phyllidia guamensis (Brunckhorst, 1993)
 Fryeria haegeli Fahrner & Beck, 2000: synonym of Phyllidia haegeli (Fahrner & Beck, 2000)
 Fryeria larryi   Brunckhorst, 1993: synonym of Phyllidia larryi (Brunckhorst, 1993)
 Fryeria marindica   (Yonow & Hayward, 1991): synonym of Phyllidia marindica (Yonow & Hayward, 1991)
 Fryeria menindie   (Brunckhorst, 1993) : synonym of Phyllidia picta Pruvot-Fol, 1957
 Fryeria picta   (Pruvot-Fol, 1957) : synonym of Phyllidia picta Pruvot-Fol, 1957
 Fryeria pustulosa Gray, 1853: synonym of Fryeria rueppelii Bergh, 1869: synonym of Phyllidia rueppelii (Bergh, 1869)
 Fryeria rueppelii   Bergh, 1869: synonym of Phyllidia rueppelii (Bergh, 1869)
 Fryeria variabilis Collingwood, 1881: synonym of Phyllidiella pustulosa (Cuvier, 1804)

References

 Valdés Á. & Gosliner T.M. (1999). Phylogeny of the radula-less dorids (Mollusca, Nudibranchia), with the description of a new genus and a new family. Zoologica Scripta 28: 315-360. 
 Gofas, S.; Le Renard, J.; Bouchet, P. (2001). Mollusca, in: Costello, M.J. et al. (Ed.) (2001). European register of marine species: a check-list of the marine species in Europe and a bibliography of guides to their identification. Collection Patrimoines Naturels, 50: pp. 180–213 page(s): 356

Dendrodorididae
Gastropod genera